Steve Crosby (born 1950) is an American former professional football coach and player.

Steve Crosby may also refer to:
Steve Crosby (music), British record producer, songwriter and music manager

See also
Steve Crosbie (born 1993), Irish former rugby union player
Stephen Crosby (1808–1869), American politician